The 1983–84 NBA season was the Bullets 23rd season in the NBA and their 11th season in the city of Washington, D.C.

Draft picks

Roster

Regular season

Season standings

Notes
 z, y – division champions
 x – clinched playoff spot

Record vs. opponents

Game log

Regular season

|- align="center" bgcolor="#ffcccc"
| 1
| October 28
| @ Philadelphia
| L 114–117
|
|
|
| The Spectrum
| 0–1
|- align="center" bgcolor="#ffcccc"
| 2
| October 29
| @ New York
| L 97–100
|
|
|
| Madison Square Garden
| 0–2

|- align="center" bgcolor="#ffcccc"
| 3
| November 1
| @ Atlanta
| L 92–95
|
|
|
| The Omni
| 0–3
|- align="center" bgcolor="#ccffcc"
| 4
| November 3
| Detroit
| W 111–88
|
|
|
| Capital Centre
| 1–3
|- align="center" bgcolor="#ffcccc"
| 5
| November 5
| Boston
| L 117–120
|
|
|
| Capital Centre
| 1–4
|- align="center" bgcolor="#ccffcc"
| 6
| November 8
| San Diego
| W 119–113
|
|
|
| Capital Centre
| 2–4
|- align="center" bgcolor="#ffcccc"
| 7
| November 9
| @ New Jersey
| L 110–127
|
|
|
| Brendan Byrne Arena
| 2–5
|- align="center" bgcolor="#ccffcc"
| 8
| November 11
| Chicago
| W 125–124 (2OT)
|
|
|
| Capital Centre
| 3–5
|- align="center" bgcolor="#ffcccc"
| 9
| November 15
| Kansas City
| L 100–101
|
|
|
| Capital Centre
| 3–6
|- align="center" bgcolor="#ccffcc"
| 10
| November 17
| Indiana
| W 102–94
|
|
|
| Capital Centre
| 4–6
|- align="center" bgcolor="#ccffcc"
| 11
| November 19
| Utah
| W 126–113
|
|
|
| Capital Centre
| 5–6
|- align="center" bgcolor="#ffcccc"
| 12
| November 22
| Golden State
| L 101–102
|
|
|
| Capital Centre
| 5–7
|- align="center" bgcolor="#ffcccc"
| 13
| November 23
| @ Cleveland
| L 98–107
|
|
|
| Richfield Coliseum
| 5–8
|- align="center" bgcolor="#ccffcc"
| 14
| November 25
| @ Detroit
| W 120–111
|
|
|
| Pontiac Silverdome
| 6–8
|- align="center" bgcolor="#ffcccc"
| 15
| November 26
| @ Milwaukee
| L 92–109
|
|
|
| MECCA Arena
| 6–9
|- align="center" bgcolor="#ffcccc"
| 16
| November 29
| Milwaukee
| L 89–94
|
|
|
| Capital Centre
| 6–10

|- align="center" bgcolor="#ffcccc"
| 17
| December 1
| @ New York
| L 93–127
|
|
|
| Madison Square Garden
| 6–11
|- align="center" bgcolor="#ccffcc"
| 18
| December 3
| Philadelphia
| W 103–98
|
|
|
| Capital Centre
| 7–11
|- align="center" bgcolor="#ccffcc"
| 19
| December 6
| @ Houston
| W 113–109
|
|
|
| The Summit
| 8–11
|- align="center" bgcolor="#ccffcc"
| 20
| December 7
| @ Dallas
| W 114–112
|
|
|
| Reunion Arena
| 9–11
|- align="center" bgcolor="#ffcccc"
| 21
| December 10
| @ San Antonio
| L 102–125
|
|
|
| HemisFair Arena
| 9–12
|- align="center" bgcolor="#ffcccc"
| 22
| December 13
| Atlanta
| L 89–94
|
|
|
| Capital Centre
| 9–13
|- align="center" bgcolor="#ccffcc"
| 23
| December 14
| @ Atlanta
| W 99–96
|
|
|
| The Omni
| 10–13
|- align="center" bgcolor="#ccffcc"
| 24
| December 16
| @ Boston
| W 100–93
|
|
|
| Boston Garden
| 11–13
|- align="center" bgcolor="#ccffcc"
| 25
| December 17
| Cleveland
| W 119–95
|
|
|
| Capital Centre
| 12–13
|- align="center" bgcolor="#ccffcc"
| 26
| December 20
| San Antonio
| W 108–106 (OT)
|
|
|
| Capital Centre
| 13–13
|- align="center" bgcolor="#ffcccc"
| 27
| December 23
| @ Chicago
| L 93–114
|
|
|
| Chicago Stadium
| 13–14
|- align="center" bgcolor="#ccffcc"
| 28
| December 27
| New Jersey
| W 116–106
|
|
|
| Capital Centre
| 14–14
|- align="center" bgcolor="#ccffcc"
| 29
| December 30
| New York
| W 91–86
|
|
|
| Capital Centre
| 15–14

|- align="center" bgcolor="#ccffcc"
| 30
| January 3
| Detroit
| W 103–102
|
|
|
| Capital Centre
| 16–14
|- align="center" bgcolor="#ffcccc"
| 31
| January 4
| @ Boston
| L 104–113
|
|
|
| Boston Garden
| 16–15
|- align="center" bgcolor="#ccffcc"
| 32
| January 6
| Chicago
| W 96–88 (OT)
|
|
|
| Capital Centre
| 17–15
|- align="center" bgcolor="#ffcccc"
| 33
| January 7
| @ Chicago
| L 73–87
|
|
|
| Chicago Stadium
| 17–16
|- align="center" bgcolor="#ffcccc"
| 34
| January 9
| @ New Jersey
| L 103–107
|
|
|
| Brendan Byrne Arena
| 17–17
|- align="center" bgcolor="#ffcccc"
| 35
| January 11
| @ Philadelphia
| L 99–121
|
|
|
| The Spectrum
| 17–18
|- align="center" bgcolor="#ffcccc"
| 36
| January 12
| Atlanta
| L 91–106
|
|
|
| Capital Centre
| 17–19
|- align="center" bgcolor="#ccffcc"
| 37
| January 14
| @ Utah
| L 96–121
|
|
|
| Salt Palace Acord Arena
| 17–20
|- align="center" bgcolor="#ffcccc"
| 38
| January 15
| @ Phoenix
| L 101–110
|
|
|
| Arizona Veterans Memorial Coliseum
| 17–21
|- align="center" bgcolor="#ffcccc"
| 39
| January 17
| @ Los Angeles
| L 95–108
|
|
|
| The Forum
| 17–22
|- align="center" bgcolor="#ffcccc"
| 40
| January 18
| @ San Diego
| L 101–110
|
|
|
| San Diego Sports Arena
| 17–23
|- align="center" bgcolor="#ffcccc"
| 41
| January 20
| @ Milwaukee
| L 103–133
|
|
|
| MECCA Arena
| 17–24
|- align="center" bgcolor="#ccffcc"
| 42
| January 21
| Philadelphia
| W 94–90
|
|
|
| Capital Centre
| 18–24
|- align="center" bgcolor="#ccffcc"
| 43
| January 24
| Milwaukee
| W 123–117 (2OT)
|
|
|
| Capital Centre
| 19–24
|- align="center" bgcolor="#ffcccc"
| 44
| January 26
| New York
| L 97–104
|
|
|
| Capital Centre
| 19–25
|- align="center" bgcolor="#ccffcc"
| 45
| January 31
| Atlanta
| W 118–94
|
|
|
| Capital Centre
| 20–25

|- align="center" bgcolor="#ffcccc"
| 46
| February 2
| Detroit
| L 129–139
|
|
|
| Capital Centre
| 20–26
|- align="center" bgcolor="#ccffcc"
| 47
| February 4
| Indiana
| W 125–101
|
|
|
| Capital Centre
| 21–26
|- align="center" bgcolor="#ccffcc"
| 48
| February 7
| Houston
| W 95–92
|
|
|
| Capital Centre
| 22–26
|- align="center" bgcolor="#ccffcc"
| 49
| February 10
| Los Angeles
| W 96–93
|
|
|
| Capital Centre
| 23–26
|- align="center" bgcolor="#ffcccc"
| 50
| February 11
| @ Kansas City
| L 91–94
|
|
|
| Kemper Arena
| 23–27
|- align="center" bgcolor="#ccffcc"
| 51
| February 14
| @ Denver
| W 108–96
|
|
|
| McNichols Sports Arena
| 24–27
|- align="center" bgcolor="#ffcccc"
| 52
| February 15
| @ Seattle
| L 99–116
|
|
|
| Kingdome
| 24–28
|- align="center" bgcolor="#ccffcc"
| 53
| February 17
| @ Portland
| W 96–87
|
|
|
| Memorial Coliseum
| 25–28
|- align="center" bgcolor="#ffcccc"
| 54
| February 18
| @ Golden State
| L 107–113
|
|
|
| Oakland–Alameda County Coliseum Arena
| 25–29
|- align="center" bgcolor="#ffcccc"
| 55
| February 22
| Portland
| L 101–104
|
|
|
| Capital Centre
| 25–30
|- align="center" bgcolor="#ccffcc"
| 56
| February 24
| @ Chicago
| W 102–96
|
|
|
| Chicago Stadium
| 26–30
|- align="center" bgcolor="#ffcccc"
| 57
| February 25
| @ Cleveland
| L 83–94
|
|
|
| Richfield Coliseum
| 26–31
|- align="center" bgcolor="#ccffcc"
| 58
| February 28
| @ Indiana
| W 100–92
|
|
|
| Market Square Arena
| 27–31
|- align="center" bgcolor="#ffcccc"
| 59
| February 29
| @ Detroit
| L 106–137
|
|
|
| Pontiac Silverdome
| 27–32

|- align="center" bgcolor="#ffcccc"
| 60
| March 2
| Milwaukee
| L 78–98
|
|
|
| Capital Centre
| 27–33
|- align="center" bgcolor="#ffcccc"
| 61
| March 3
| @ New Jersey
| L 90–100
|
|
|
| Brendan Byrne Arena
| 27–34
|- align="center" bgcolor="#ffcccc"
| 62
| March 6
| Boston
| L 85–108
|
|
|
| Capital Centre
| 27–35
|- align="center" bgcolor="#ccffcc"
| 63
| March 8
| Seattle
| W 106–96
|
|
|
| Capital Centre
| 28–35
|- align="center" bgcolor="#ffcccc"
| 64
| March 10
| @ Detroit
| L 100–115
|
|
|
| Pontiac Silverdome
| 28–36
|- align="center" bgcolor="#ccffcc"
| 65
| March 13
| Denver
| W 108–103
|
|
|
| Capital Centre
| 29–36
|- align="center" bgcolor="#ccffcc"
| 66
| March 14
| @ Boston
| W 103–99
|
|
|
| Boston Garden
| 30–36
|- align="center" bgcolor="#ffcccc"
| 67
| March 16
| Phoenix
| L 109–110 (OT)
|
|
|
| Capital Centre
| 30–37
|- align="center" bgcolor="#ffcccc"
| 68
| March 18
| @ Milwaukee
| L 101–109
|
|
|
| MECCA Arena
| 30–38
|- align="center" bgcolor="#ccffcc"
| 69
| March 20
| New Jersey
| W 99–91
|
|
|
| Capital Centre
| 31–38
|- align="center" bgcolor="#ffcccc"
| 70
| March 22
| Philadelphia
| L 101–106
|
|
|
| Capital Centre
| 31–39
|- align="center" bgcolor="#ffcccc"
| 71
| March 24
| @ New York
| L 99–107
|
|
|
| Madison Square Garden
| 31–40
|- align="center" bgcolor="#ffcccc"
| 72
| March 25
| @ Cleveland
| L 96–101
|
|
|
| Richfield Coliseum
| 31–41
|- align="center" bgcolor="#ffcccc"
| 73
| March 27
| Boston
| L 93–106
|
|
|
| Capital Centre
| 31–42
|- align="center" bgcolor="#ffcccc"
| 74
| March 28
| @ Philadelphia
| L 103–109
|
|
|
| The Spectrum
| 31–43
|- align="center" bgcolor="#ccffcc"
| 75
| March 30
| New York
| W 107–79
|
|
|
| Capital Centre
| 32–43

|- align="center" bgcolor="#ccffcc"
| 76
| April 1
| Dallas
| W 102–98
|
|
|
| Capital Centre
| 33–43
|- align="center" bgcolor="#ccffcc"
| 77
| April 3
| Indiana
| W 106–94
|
|
|
| Capital Centre
| 34–43
|- align="center" bgcolor="#ffcccc"
| 78
| April 4
| @ Atlanta
| L 92–99
|
|
|
| The Omni
| 34–44
|- align="center" bgcolor="#ffcccc"
| 79
| April 7
| New Jersey
| L 98–121
|
|
|
| Capital Centre
| 34–45
|- align="center" bgcolor="#ccffcc"
| 80
| April 9
| Chicago
| W 136–134 (2OT)
|
|
|
| Capital Centre
| 35–45
|- align="center" bgcolor="#ffcccc"
| 81
| April 13
| @ Indiana
| L 115–119
|
|
|
| Market Square Arena
| 35–46
|- align="center" bgcolor="#ffcccc"
| 82
| April 14
| Cleveland
| L 109–117
|
|
|
| Capital Centre
| 35–47

Playoffs

|- align="center" bgcolor="#ffcccc"
| 1
| April 17
| @ Boston
| L 83–91
| Ricky Sobers (24)
| Rick Mahorn (14)
| Jeff Ruland (10)
| Boston Garden14,890
| 0–1
|- align="center" bgcolor="#ffcccc"
| 2
| April 19
| @ Boston
| L 85–88
| Greg Ballard (20)
| Jeff Ruland (10)
| Jeff Ruland (8)
| Boston Garden14,890
| 0–2
|- align="center" bgcolor="#ccffcc"
| 3
| April 21
| Boston
| W 111–108 (OT)
| Jeff Ruland (33)
| Rick Mahorn (15)
| Ricky Sobers (11)
| Capital Centre8,359
| 1–2
|- align="center" bgcolor="#ffcccc"
| 4
| April 24
| Boston
| L 96–99
| Jeff Ruland (30)
| Jeff Ruland (15)
| Jeff Ruland (8)
| Capital Centre13,853
| 1–3
|-

Player statistics

Season

Playoffs

Awards and records
 Jeff Malone, NBA All-Rookie Team 1st Team

Transactions

References

See also
 1983–84 NBA season

Washington Wizards seasons
Wash
Washing
Washing